Calosoma pseudocarabus is a species of ground beetle in the subfamily of Carabinae. It was described by Semenov & Redikorzev in 1928.

References

pseudocarabus
Beetles described in 1928